Municipality elections were held in Norway in 1925.

Result of municipal elections
Results of the 1925 municipal elections. Results can only be given separately by rural areas and cities.

Cities

Rural areas

References

1925
1925
Norway
1925 in Norway
October 1925 events
December 1925 events